St Mary's Secondary School is a Roman Catholic secondary school for girls in Zomba, Malawi. 

The school was founded in 1962.

The school hosted the 2018 Zodiak Broadcasting Station Girl Child Awards for excellence in Malawi School Certificate of Education (MSCE) examination results. Of the eleven awardees with the highest marks in the country, four were students at St Mary's. In the 2019 MCSE examination results St Mary's secured a place in the top ten schools in Malawi.

Alumni
 Gertrude Mutharika, First Lady of Malawi.

References

Girls' schools in Africa
High schools and secondary schools in Malawi
Catholic schools in Malawi
1962 establishments in Africa
Educational institutions established in 1962